Khattab may refer to:

People
Zayd ibn al-Khattab, companion of Muḥammad
Fatimah bint al-Khattab, Female companion of Muhammad
Khattab ibn Nufayl, Arab of the Quraish tribe
Umar al-Khattab, Muslim caliph
Ali Khattab, Egyptian musician
Sabri Khattab, Egyptian footballer playing in Norway
Abdullah Khattab, Saudi footballer
Tareq Khattab, Jordanian footballer
Yousef al-Khattab, American Revolution Muslim leader
Ibn al-Khattab, Saudi born Chechen military leader
Abu Khattab al-Tunisi, military leader
Nejib Khattab, Tunisian presenter
Abdul Hadi Abdul Khattab, Malaysian politician
Moushira Khattab, Egyptian politician
Mustafa Khattab, Quranic translator

Places
 Khaţab-e Soflá, Maragheh, Iran
 Khotb, Maragheh, Iran
 Khattab, Bojnord, Iran
 Khattab, Shirvan, Iran
 Khaṭāb (Shahrak-e Qaem), Bojnord, Iran
 Khitab, Hama Governorate, Syria

See also
Khattabi, a surname

Arabic-language surnames
Bosniak masculine given names